The 1981 Duke Blue Devils football team represented the Duke Blue Devils of Duke University during the 1981 NCAA Division I-A football season. Duke's offense became the first in ACC history to average over 300 yards a game passing.

Schedule

Personnel

Awards and honors
Chris Castor, ACC Offensive Player of the Year

References

Duke
Duke Blue Devils football seasons
Duke Blue Devils football